Grigalashvili is a Georgian surname. Notable people with the surname include:
Elgujja Grigalashvili (born 1989), Georgian footballer
Shota Grigalashvili (born 1986), Georgian footballer
Tato Grigalashvili (born 1999), Georgian judoka
Tornike Grigalashvili (born 1993), Georgian football player

Surnames of Georgian origin
Georgian-language surnames